Michał Rola-Żymierski (4 September 189015 October 1989) was a Polish high-ranking Communist Party leader, communist military commander and NKVD secret agent. He was appointed as Marshal of Poland by Joseph Stalin, and served in this position from 1945 until his death. He supported the 1981 imposition of Martial law in Poland.

Early life
Rola-Żymierski was born Michał Łyżwiński in Kraków under the Austrian Partition, to the family of railway clerk, Wojciech Łyżwiński.  He joined the Zarzewie and later joined the Polish Rifle Squads. At the age of 20, he enrolled at the law faculty of the Jagiellonian University in 1910, but was drafted a year later. In the years 1911–1912, he served compulsory service in the Austro-Hungarian Army, where he graduated from the school of reserve officers. After his brother committed a widely publicised murder-robbery in Kraków, he began to call himself Żymierski around 1913.

Military career

World War I
When World War I erupted in 1914, he joined the Polish Legions. He initially served as a company and battalion commander of the 1st Brigade. Żymierski fought in the Battle of Laski and Anielin and in the vicinity of the Dęblin Fortress, where on October 23, 1914 he was seriously wounded. In the summer of 1915, after his promotion to the rank of major, he served as commander of Polish Military Organisation. After the Oath Crisis of 1917, he retired from the Austro-Hungarian army with rank of lieutenant colonel and returned to Kraków, where he graduated from the Kraków Trading School. He later became the commander of the 2nd Infantry Regiment in the Polish Auxiliary Corps.

In February 1918, after the signing of Treaty of Brest, he was the initiator of the rebellion of 2nd Legion Brigade and its breakthrough through the front during the Battle of Rarańcza. Then he handed over the command of this formation to General Józef Haller. After the front had passed, he became the chief of staff of the Polish II Corps in Russia following his promotion to the rank of colonel. After the corps was disarmed by the Germans after the Battle of Kaniów in May 1918, he served in command positions in the Polish Military Organization in Russia. He was the commander of the 2nd Infantry Regiment in the 4th Polish Rifle Division.

Polish-Soviet war
In 1918, he joined the reborn Polish Army. In March 1919, he was appointed commander of the Ciechanów Military District. In August 1919, in connection with the outbreak of the First Silesian Uprising, he became the head of the branch of the Supreme Command for the Silesian Uprising with the task of managing the insurgent action in Upper Silesia. During the Polish-Soviet War, he took over a section of the front near the Berezina River. He served as the commander of the 2nd Brigade and then the 2nd Legions Infantry Division. For his performance during this phase of the war, he was awarded the Virtuti Militari V class.

Post war

After the war, he was sent to Paris, where he graduated from École spéciale militaire de Saint-Cyr. He then completed an internship at the French General Staff. Upon his return, he was promoted to General. Żymierski served in Warsaw as the Deputy Chief of Administration of the Polish Army. Żymierski was appointed deputy head of the Army Administration for Armaments, where he was responsible for finances and purchases of military equipment at the Ministry of Military Affairs.

One of his subordinates and later Prime Minister Felicjan Sławoj Składkowski, in his memoirs written in exile succinctly commented on his economic talents. In his 1921 opinion about Żymierski, Marshal Edward Rydz-Śmigły wrote:
"A very good officer of the General Staff in the higher commands, talented, very dutiful, very active, excellent educator of the officer corps, very good administrator, with great initiative."

During the 1926 coup d'état, he defended the democratically elected government of Stanisław Wojciechowski. After the coup, in 1927, the new sanacja regime of Marshal Józef Piłsudski charged him with bribery and embezzlement. Following an official investigation, he was court-martialled and demoted to private first class, expelled from the army and sentenced to five years in prison. Karol Popiel later claimed that accusing Żymierski of corruption was a kind of political revenge on the part of Józef Piłsudski and was supposed to indirectly discredit Władysław Sikorski.

Upon his release in 1931, Żymierski went to France. He was recruited by Soviet intelligence and became a well-paid secret agent delivering information about the Franco-Polish alliance. He joined the Communist Party of Poland. His secret engagement with Moscow was discontinued when Stalin ordered the dissolution of the Polish Communist Party (KPP) in 1938 during the Great Purge.

World War II

Żymierski returned to Poland shortly before the Nazi-Soviet invasion of Poland at the onset of World War II, and soon resumed his clandestine work for the NKVD (as revealed first by Józef Światło). He unsuccessfully applied for return to the army. In the fall of 1939, he obtained false documents in the name of Zwoliński which he used it during the German occupation of Poland. According to the official biography of Żymierski, published anonymously in 1986, in February 1940 an underground civil court composed of anti-Piłsudski activists considered the 1927 arrest and sentencing of Żymierski as unjust and rehabilitated him. The civil court was probably unaware that Żymierski was then an agent of the NKVD, and the court's decision had no legal significance and force in the light of the applicable criminal law of the Second Polish Republic, as the only judicial authorities that could acquit Żymierski under the conditions of the occupation was the judicial system operating from May 1940.

Under the pseudonym "Rola", he engaged in the Soviet dealings with Nazi German Gestapo secret police. In 1943, by Soviet executive order, he was named the deputy commander of the Communist and Soviet-backed Gwardia Ludowa, and from 1944, the commander of Armia Ludowa. He was promoted by the Communist-backed Polish Committee of National Liberation back to the rank of General and became the commander-in-chief of the Polish Army fighting alongside the Soviet Union (the Polish Armed Forces in the East). He was Minister of Defence in the Provisional Government of the Republic of Poland (Rząd Tymczasowy Rzeczypospolitej Polskiej, January–June 1945). On 3 May 1945, by order of Stalin, he was promoted to the rank of Marshal of Poland.

Post-war

On June 15, 1945, when the controversy over establishing the border with Czechoslovakia intensified, Żymierski, replacing the absent prime minister, issued an ultimatum to the Czechoslovak side. After its rejection, Polish troops entered Cieszyn Silesia. Żymierski announced the further advance of Polish troops beyond Olza, Silesian Voivodeship. The order was quickly suspended by a decision of the Polish political authorities.

From 1946, Żymierski served as head of the Commission of State Security. He was responsible for repressions against the former resistance fighters, members of the Polish 2nd Corps and non-communist politicians, as well as for the deployment of the Polish Army against Poland's Freedom and Independence fighters; and the roundup of Ukrainian families in Operation Vistula against the OUN-UPA. Until 1949, he also held the post of Minister of National Defence. In this year, he was replaced by the Polish-born Soviet Marshal, Konstanty Rokossowski, who received the rank of Marshal of Poland and held his office until 1956. As a consequence of Stalinist purges organised in Poland by Bolesław Bierut, Żymierski was arrested in 1952. However, he was released in 1955 without any charges. He was rehabilitated by the Polish government in 1956.

After the end of Stalinism in Poland, he held various posts, including deputy head of the National Bank of Poland (between 1956 and 1967) and the honorary head of the ZBoWiD (Society of Fighters for Freedom and Democracy, an organisation of Polish war veterans). He was also a member of the Polish United Workers' Party and, after Wojciech Jaruzelski's introduction of martial law in Poland, Żymierski also became a member of its Central Committee and of the Front of National Unity.

He died in Warsaw on 15 October 1989 and was the last person to hold the rank of Marshal of Poland. He was buried with full military honors at Powązki Military Cemetery in Warsaw. Żymierski's grave was desecrated twice by unknown perpetrators.

Honours and awards

Poland

USSR

Other countries

Honorary Citizen
Żymierski received the title of 'Honorary Citizen' of cities Bielsko-Biała, Kraków, Włocławek, Płock, Chełm, Toruń, Kłodzko, Bydgoszcz, Łęczyca and Sosnowiec. Following the fall of communist rule in Poland on 1989, city councils of Bielsko-Biała, Kraków, Włocławek, Płock and Chełm passed resolutions that declared the withdrawal of Żymierski's honorary citizenship because of his role in implementing the communist regime in Poland.

References

Further reading
Andrew A. Michta, Red Eagle: The army in Polish politics 1944-1988.

External links
 Sprawa karna Michała Żymierskiego (2) at Palestra
 Sprawa karna Michała Żymierskiego (3) at Palestra

1890 births
1989 deaths
Politicians from Kraków
People from the Kingdom of Galicia and Lodomeria
Polish Austro-Hungarians
Communist Party of Poland politicians
Polish Workers' Party politicians
Collaborators with the Soviet Union
Politicide perpetrators
Members of the Central Committee of the Polish United Workers' Party
Ministers of National Defence of Poland
Members of the State National Council
Members of the Polish Sejm 1947–1952
Marshals of Poland
Polish generals
Polish Rifle Squads members
Polish Military Organisation members
Polish legionnaires (World War I)
Polish Auxiliary Corps personnel
People of the Polish May Coup (pro-government side)
Polish military personnel of World War II
École Spéciale Militaire de Saint-Cyr alumni
Recipients of the Silver Cross of the Virtuti Militari
Grand Crosses of the Virtuti Militari
Recipients of the Virtuti Militari (1943–1989)
Recipients of the Order of the Cross of Grunwald, 1st class
Grand Crosses of the Order of Polonia Restituta
Commanders of the Order of Polonia Restituta
Recipients of the Cross of Valour (Poland)
Recipients of the Order of Polonia Restituta (1944–1989)
Recipients of the Order of the Builders of People's Poland
Recipients of the Order of the Banner of Work
Recipients of the Order of the People's Hero
Recipients of the Order of Lenin
Recipients of the Order of Victory
Recipients of the Order of Friendship of Peoples
Commanders of the Order of the Crown (Belgium)
Grand Crosses of the Order of the White Lion
Grand Croix of the Légion d'honneur
Officiers of the Légion d'honneur
Chevaliers of the Légion d'honneur
Chief Commanders of the Legion of Merit
Burials at Powązki Military Cemetery